In linguistics, the ultima is the last syllable of a word, the penult is the next-to-last syllable, and the antepenult is third-from-last syllable. In a word of three syllables, the names of the syllables are antepenult-penult-ultima.

Etymology
Ultima comes from Latin ultima (syllaba) "last (syllable)". Penult and antepenult are abbreviations for paenultima and antepaenultima. Penult has the prefix paene "almost", and antepenult has the prefix ante "before".

Classical languages
In Latin and Ancient Greek, only the three last syllables can be accented. In Latin, a word's stress is dependent on the weight or length of the penultimate syllable; in Greek, the place and type of accent is dependent on the length of the vowel in the ultima.

See also

Pitch accent
Acute accent
Oxytone, paroxytone, proparoxytone
Circumflex
Perispomenon, properispomenon
Grave accent
Barytone
Rhyme
Stress (linguistics)
Syllable

References

Herbert Weir Smyth. Greek Grammar. par. 166, 167.

Phonology
Greek grammar
Ancient Greek